The Ocongate District is one of the twelve districts in the Quispicanchi Province in Peru. Created on January 2, 1857, its capital is the town of Ocongate.

Geography 
The Willkanuta mountain range traverses the district. Some of the highest peaks are listed below:

Ethnic groups 
The people in the district are mainly indigenous citizens of Quechua descent. Quechua is the language which the majority of the population (90.98%) learnt to speak in childhood, 8.69% of the residents started speaking using the Spanish language (2007 Peru Census).

See also 
 Armaqucha
  Pukaqucha
 Sinkrinaqucha
 Siwinaqucha
 Warurumiqucha

References  
Notes

Sources
  Instituto Nacional de Estadística e Informática. Departamento Cusco. Retrieved on November 1, 2007.

1857 establishments in Peru